BJK or Beşiktaş JK is a Turkish sports club.

BJK or bjk may also refer to:
 Benjina-Nangasuri Airport, Maluku, Indonesia (IATA code: BJK)
 Barok language of New Ireland, PNG (ISO code: bjk)
 Big Jock Knew, Scottish football chant
 Billie Jean King, American tennis player 
 USTA Billie Jean King National Tennis Center